Benjamin F. Wade House was the home of Civil War-era politician Benjamin Wade. Before its demolition in 1968, it was located at Jefferson, Ashtabula County in Ohio.

History 
The house was likely dated from the time of the Civil War, was a two-story clapboard structure with a mansard roof. It was the residence of US senator and abolitionist Benjamin Franklin Wade. Later in the 20th century, it was owned by Jefferson Savings and Loan Company. The house was demolished in the summer of 1968 and its lot was later used as a parking for the company.

The house was designated a National Historic Landmark in 1965 but withdrawn somewhere between 1968 and 1970 for no longer meeting the criteria after being demolished.

Gallery

References 

Demolished buildings and structures in Ohio
National Register of Historic Places in Jefferson County, Ohio
Buildings and structures demolished in 1968
Abolitionism in the United States

Former National Historic Landmarks of the United States
Former National Register of Historic Places in Ohio